Loyzaga is a Spanish surname. Notable people with the surname include:

 Bing Loyzaga (born 1970), Filipino actress
 Carlos Loyzaga (1930–2016), Filipino basketball player and coach
 Chito Loyzaga (born 1958), Filipino basketball player
 Diego Loyzaga (born 1995), Filipino actor
 Joaquín Loyzaga, Filipino footballer
 Joey Loyzaga (born 1961), Filipino basketball player
 , Spanish sculptor